Woman Basketball Player No. 5 is a 1957 Chinese film presented by Tianma Film Studio and directed by Xie Jin, starring Qin Yi, Liu Qiong, Cao Qiwei and Wang Qi. It is the first colored sports movie filmed after the formation of the People's Republic of China. Yang Jie (杨洁), who was No. 5 in China women's national basketball team, was the prototype of the film.

Plot
Before the establishment of PRC, Lin Jie, the daughter of the boss of East China Basketball Team in Shanghai, falls in love with the leading player of the team, Tian Zhenhua. During a game against foreign marine soldiers, the boss takes bribery and orders the team to lose the game. Due to his nationalist dignity, however, Tian leads the team to victory, against the will of the boss. As a result, the boss hires thugs to beat Tian, and also forces his daughter to marry a rich man. 18 years later, Tian is now the coach of Shanghai Woman Basketball Team. Xiao Jie, the daughter of Lin, is a girl with basketball talent but who also has prejudice towards a sports career. Tian educates and helps her with patience. Xiao Jie is injured in a game and hospitalized. Tian and Lin accidentally reunite when both visiting Xiao Jie and their love is reborn. Xiao Jie is later elected into the national team to participate in international games.

References

External links

Woman Basketball Player No.5 at the Chinese Movie Database

1957 films
1950s Mandarin-language films
Chinese basketball films
Films about women's sports
Films directed by Xie Jin
1950s sports films